Yiannis Tomaras (Greek: Γιάννης Τομαράς; born 16 March 1947) is a former Greek football player of the late 1960s - early 1970s era.

Tomaras played right back for Panathinaikos between the years 1968 and 1974.

He played for Panathinaikos at 1971 European Cup Final.

Tomaras was seriously injured on 15 December 1971, with a double break of his leg, in the Panathinaikos - Nacional Montevideo home game for the Intercontinental Cup.

References

1947 births
Living people
Panathinaikos F.C. players
Association football midfielders
Greece international footballers
Footballers from Athens
Greek footballers